James Imrie (born 1909, date of death unknown) was a Scottish footballer who played as goalkeeper, for Kettering Town, Crystal Palace, Luton Town, and Doncaster Rovers.

Imrie started off playing for Dunbeath Star, in Scotland before moving to England to join Kettering.

Career

Crystal Palace
Palace bought 5 players from Kettering, including Imrie, in March 1929. This was a record at that time.

Luton Town
In August 1931, he was transferred to Luton where became the regular keeper, playing 63 games in his two seasons there.

Doncaster Rovers
Imrie was brought to Doncaster for the start of the 1933–34 season by secretary-manager David Menzies who came from the same part of Scotland. He kept a clean sheet in his first game, a 1–0 home victory over New Brighton. He went on to play 140 League and Cup games for the club.

In April 1939, over 4,000 turned up for his benefit match against Leeds United of the First Division. This was to be his last game for Rovers as he wasn't retained for the following season.

Honours
Crystal Palace
Division 3 (South) Runners-up 1928–29
Division 3 (South) Runners-up 1930–31

Doncaster Rovers
Division 3 (North) Champions 1934–35
Division 3 (North) Runners-up 1937–38
Division 3 (North) Runners-up 1938–39

References

1909 births
Year of death unknown
People from Markinch
Association football goalkeepers
Scottish footballers
Kettering Town F.C. players
Crystal Palace F.C. players
Luton Town F.C. players
Doncaster Rovers F.C. players
English Football League players